Aurelio González is the name of:

Aurelio González (boxer) (born 1939), Argentine boxer
Aurelio González (footballer) (1905–1997), Paraguayan football player
Aurelio D. Gonzales, Jr. (born 1964), Filipino politician
Aurelio González Puente (born 1940), Spanish retired road racing cyclist
Aurelio González Ovies (born 1964), Spanish writer and poet